Jacuzzi is a company producing whirlpool bathtubs and spas. The term 'jacuzzi' is often used generically to refer to any bathtub with underwater massage jets.

Jacuzzi may also refer to:
 Hot tub
 Candido Jacuzzi (1903–1986), Italian-American inventor
 Romain Jacuzzi (born 1984), French footballer
 Jacuzzi Splot, a character in the light novel and anime series Baccano!
 a song by Canadian hip-hop band Radio Radio from the 2008 album Cliché Hot
 a song by Finnish singer Sanni Kurkisuo